Amando Joseph Aust (born 23 April 1990), better known as Amando, is a professional footballer who plays as a centre-back for TuS Dassendorf and the Gambia national football team.

International career
Aust was born in Germany and is of Gambian descent. He was called up to the Gambia national football team for a pair of international friendlies against Morocco U20s and Central African Republic in March 2017. He made his international debut in a 2–1 friendly win over the Central African Republic on 27 March 2017.

References

External links
 Aust Sport.de Profile
 
 FuPa Profile

1990 births
Living people
Sportspeople from Bielefeld
German people of Gambian descent
German sportspeople of African descent
People with acquired Gambian citizenship
German footballers
Gambian footballers
Footballers from North Rhine-Westphalia
Footballers from Berlin
Association football defenders
Regionalliga players
Holstein Kiel players
VfR Neumünster players
TSG Neustrelitz players
TuS Dassendorf players
The Gambia international footballers